Saïd Sayrafiezadeh  (born 1968) is an American memoirist, playwright and fiction writer living in New York City. He won a 2010 Whiting Award for his memoir, When Skateboards Will Be Free. He is the author of two story collections, American Estrangement (2021) and Brief Encounters With the Enemy, which was short-listed for the 2014 PEN/Robert W. Bingham Prize for debut fiction. He serves on the board of directors for the New York Foundation for the Arts.

Early life and education
Sayrafiezadeh was born in Brooklyn, New York, to an Iranian father, Mahmoud Sayrafiezadeh, and an American Jewish mother, Martha Harris, both of whom were members of the Socialist Workers Party. He was raised in Pittsburgh, Pennsylvania. His maternal uncle was the novelist Mark Harris. He lives in New York City.

He attended the University of Pittsburgh, but dropped out his senior year.

Work

Sayrafiezadeh has published essays and short stories in a number of outlets, including The New Yorker, The Paris Review, The New York Times, Granta, and McSweeney's.

His plays include New York is Bleeding, Autobiography of a Terrorist, All Fall Away, and Long Dream in Summer. They have been produced or read at South Coast Repertory, New York Theatre Workshop, The Humana Festival of New American Plays, and at The Sundance Theatre Lab.

Sayrafiezadeh has also published a memoir about his childhood in the Socialist Workers Party.

Bibliography

Short fiction
Collections
 
 
Stories

Essays and reporting

Memoirs

References

External links
Author's website
Profile at The Whiting Foundation

20th-century American Jews
American writers of Iranian descent
1968 births
Living people
The New Yorker people
Writers from Pittsburgh
American male dramatists and playwrights
American dramatists and playwrights
21st-century American Jews